Radchenskoye is a rural locality (a selo) and the administrative center of Radchenskoye Rural Settlement, Bogucharsky District, Voronezh Oblast, Russia. The population was 1,175 as of 2010. There are 23 streets.

Geography 
Radchenskoye is located on the right bank of the Levaya Bogucharka River, 18 km of from Boguchar (the district's administrative centre) by road. Dyadin is the nearest rural locality.

References 

Rural localities in Bogucharsky District